Kym Valentine (born 24 May 1977) is an Australian actress best known for her long running intermittent portrayal of Libby Kennedy in the soap opera Neighbours.

Early life
Valentine was born in Blacktown, Sydney, and grew up in Granville. She began dance classes when she was two and attended her first dance school aged six. When she was five years old, Valentine began acting in television commercials and stage plays. She appeared in about 30 commercials.

Career
Valentine's television appearances have included Brides of Christ, My Two Wives, Adult Illiteracy, At Bathurst, Candid Camera, Home and Away, Swap Shop, HoopsTV and Cheez TV

In 1994, at age 17, Valentine joined the cast of Neighbours as Libby Kennedy. She moved to Melbourne to take the role and remained on the show until 2004. Valentine opted to leave, wanting to start a family and extend her acting repertoire by returning to the stage. Libby was written out of the storyline in a way allowing for her potential return.

In 2005, Valentine took the lead role of Baby in Dirty Dancing: The Classic Story on Stage at the Theatre Royal, Sydney. She was set to reprise her role when the production moved to London's West end . In June 2007, Valentine rejoined Neighbours on a permanent basis. On 8 April 2009, Valentine made an appearance as herself on The Wright Stuff, a UK TV programme. In April 2011, Valentine took indefinite leave from Neighbours.

Valentine appeared as a housewife in Nine Network's miniseries Fat Tony & Co., which was broadcast in 2014. Valentine returned to Neighbours as part of a storyline to celebrate 20 years of the Kennedy family in 2014.

In 2017, Valentine was cast in Michael Wormald's independent film Choir Girl.

Valentine has produced the upcoming film titled "Residence. Valentine also appears in the film, playing Connie the Phlegmatic.

Personal life
Valentine married singer Fabio Tolli. They have a daughter, Millana Valentine-Tolli (b. 21 August 2003). The couple separated in 2007.

In April 2008, it emerged that Valentine was involved in a relationship with Australian actor Vince Colosimo. It was suggested that it may cause tension on the Neighbours set as Colosimo had separated from fellow Neighbours actor Jane Hall who openly blamed Valentine for the split when in fact it was Hall who ended the relationship with Colosimo over a year before he and Valentine were introduced. In October 2008, Valentine publicly announced that she and Colosimo were no longer dating and that they had only ever been friends.

Valentine announced her engagement to former AFL player Trent Croad in March 2015. In November, Valentine and Croad confirmed they were expecting their first child together. Valentine gave birth to a son named Phoenix in March 2016.

Valentine and Croad split December 2017.

Health issues
On 4 July 2008, Valentine collapsed on a flight home from New York and was diagnosed with pneumonia and pneumothorax. The cabin crew gave the actress oxygen during the flight and when she arrived in Melbourne was taken to hospital for further treatment where she stayed for several days before recuperating at home."Nightmare flight for actor Kym Valentine", Herald Sun Valentine was told that she needed to rest for a month and she could not return to work on Neighbours. On 10 August 2008, it was reported that New Zealand actress Michala Banas would take over the role of Libby for a month. Valentine resumed the role at the start of the 2009 series.

On 6 July 2010, Valentine was hospitalised with a life-threatening blood clot on her lung. Valentine was ordered to stay in hospital for four days. In December, Valentine checked herself into a clinic as she was suffering from exhaustion.

Valentine returned to the Neighbours set in January 2011. A few months after her return to filming, Valentine took indefinite leave from Neighbours. Fiona Byrne of the Herald Sun'' reported the actress was undergoing treatment in hospital for a depressive illness. She returned for two weeks in 2014.

References

External links
 

1977 births
Living people
Australian people of Maltese descent
Actresses from Sydney
Australian child actresses
Australian soap opera actresses
Australian musical theatre actresses